Çelemli is a municipality in the Yüreğir district of Adana Province.

Geography

It is situated on a low valley with an altitude of about 170 metres (560 ft). On the summit of the nearest hill there are telecommunication facilities like microwave links, TV transmitter stations, etc. The population of the town is 1365 as of 2012.

History

After Ottoman conquest of Balkan peninsula in the 14th century, Oghuz Turks in Anatolia had been transferred to Balkans, where they lived up to the second half of the 19th century. However, after the disastrous Russo-Turkish War (1877–1878) most of them had to return where they were settled in various locations in Anatolia. Çelemli residents are a part of those immigrants.

Economy
The most important economic activity is cattle dealing and dairying. Wheat, canola, watermelon, sunflower and cabbage are among the more important crops. In fact the name of the town Çelemli is a distorted form of the word kelem the popular name of cabbage among the Turks of Balkan.

Status in 2014
According to Law act no 6360, all township municipalities will be abolished and they  will be merged into the district municipality in 2014. Thus in 2014 Çelemli will be a part Yüreğir  municipality.

References

Populated places in Adana Province
Çukurova
Towns in Turkey
Yüreğir